Benjamin Thompson (April 22, 1806 – January 31, 1890) of Durham, New Hampshire, Benjamin was a farmer and businessman, and the main benefactor of the University of New Hampshire. Benjamin left the State of New Hampshire his farm and other properties. He also left "Warner Farm" which was originally part of the Valentine Hill grant at Oyster River in Durham. His total assets gifted totaled over $400,000 (Approximately $11.7 million in 2021 dollars) for the creation of an agricultural college on his property.

Thompson specified that the money and properties were to be used to establish an agricultural college.  The New Hampshire College of Agriculture and the Mechanic Arts, Which was already established in Hanover, New Hampshire was moved to Thompson's property in Durham in 1893.  The College became the University of New Hampshire in 1923.

Benjamin was the son of Benjamin Thompson Sr and Mary Pickering.

Thompson Hall, commonly referred to locally as "T-Hall", was the first building built in the center of the campus of University of New Hampshire. It was named in his honor, it currently houses some of the administrative offices, and for many years its profile was used by UNH on all documents and memorabilia.

References

External links
UNH Archives - Guide to the Benjamin Thompson Trust Fund Financial Documents, 1856-1964
On Ben's Farm UNH Magazine Online, Spring 2002

1806 births
1890 deaths
University of New Hampshire
Farmers from New Hampshire
People from Durham, New Hampshire
Businesspeople from New Hampshire